Kremlyovskaya Street is the main street of the city of Kazan, Republic of Tatarstan, Russia. The street runs from and is named after the Kazan Kremlin to the north. The street stretches south to the Kazan State University campus, located on both sides of the street.

See also
List of leading shopping streets and districts by city

Streets in Kazan